Subhash Yadav (1 April 1946 – 26 June 2013) was an Indian politician. He was Madhya Pradesh MLA for Kasrawad (1993 to 2008).
He has 4 daughters and 2 sons: Arun Subhashchandra Yadav (Congress leader & former MP ) and Sachin Yadav (MLA, Kasrawad).

Political career
He was the Deputy Chief Minister of Madhya Pradesh during the 90s.

Personal life
He was married to Smt. Damiyanti Yadav and had 4 Daughters and 2 Sons Sachin Yadav and Arun Subhashchandra Yadav, both of whom are into politics.

See also
2008 Madhya Pradesh Legislative Assembly election
2003 Madhya Pradesh Legislative Assembly election
1998 Madhya Pradesh Legislative Assembly election
1993 Madhya Pradesh Legislative Assembly election

References

Deputy Chief Ministers of Madhya Pradesh
People from Khargone district
Indian National Congress politicians
1945 births
2013 deaths
India MPs 1980–1984
Lok Sabha members from Madhya Pradesh
Madhya Pradesh MLAs 1993–1998
Madhya Pradesh MLAs 1998–2003
Madhya Pradesh MLAs 2003–2008
India MPs 1984–1989
Indian National Congress politicians from Madhya Pradesh